Murat Akin (born 22 October 1986) is a Belgian former footballer of Turkish descent who is currently the sporting director of Turkish club Fatih Karagümrük.

References

External links

1986 births
Living people
Sportspeople from Sint-Niklaas
Footballers from East Flanders
Belgian footballers
Belgian people of Turkish descent
Association football defenders
K.S.K. Beveren players
Kasımpaşa S.K. footballers
Orduspor footballers
Antalyaspor footballers
Konyaspor footballers
Kayseri Erciyesspor footballers
İstanbul Başakşehir F.K. players
Kayserispor footballers
Kardemir Karabükspor footballers
FC Wil players
Göztepe S.K. footballers
Süper Lig players
TFF First League players
Swiss Challenge League players
Expatriate footballers in Switzerland
Sportkring Sint-Niklaas players